Own It is the sixth studio album by American singer Francesca Battistelli. In June 2018, Battistelli released the lead single "The Breakup Song", followed by "This Could Change Everything" in October 2018.

Track listing

Personnel 
Adapted from Tidal.

 Josh Bronleewe – track 2
 Ian Eskelin – tracks 1, 3, 4, 6, 7, 9
 Seth Mosley – track 8
 Mike "X" O'Connor – track 8
 Tommee Profitt – track 5
 Tedd T. – track 10

Charts

Album

Singles

References 

Francesca Battistelli albums
Curb Records albums
2018 albums